The Atba-e-Malak community are a branch of Musta'ali Isma'ili Shi'a Islam that broke off from the mainstream Dawoodi Bohra after the death of the 46th Da'i al-Mutlaq, under the leadership of Moulana Abdul Hussain Jivaji Saheb in 1890. They are based in Nagpur in India. There are several hundred followers of this branch of Musta'ali Isma'ili Shi'a Islam. They have further split into two more branches:

Atba-e-Malak Badar – The current leader is Maulana Muhammad Amiruddin Malak Saheb

Atba-e-Malak Vakil – Their current leader is Moulana Tayyeb Saheb.

Atba-e-Malak Vakil
The Atba-e-Malak Vakil is Muslim-Shia-Ismaili-Tayyebi-Dawoodi-Malak-Vakil Bohra sect that firmly believes in the tradition of Nass governing the appointment of Saheb-e-Amar (spiritual successor) continuing the succession (Silsila). As per the principle of Nass, neither Imam nor Da'i al-Mutlaq can pass away without appointing their successor but after untimely and sudden demise of the 46th Da'i al-Mutlaq Syedna Mohammad Badruddin saheb, due to uncertainty and unawareness of Nass, the community divided in 2 sections.  One section believed that Nass got disbanded and the other larger section of followers accepted then Mazoon al-Da'wat Abdul Kader Najmuddin saheb as 47th Da'i al-Mutlaq as guided by Sheikh Abdeali Imaduddin (the teacher and close aide of Abdul Kader Najmuddin saheb and later his Mukaashir al-Da'wat) and fell off from the true Silsila (Succession) that was already established as the succession of four Mumalikin saheb (hidden successors - the seclusion was necessary to guard the Amar in then difficult times), last one being Moulana Adamji Tayyebji saheb in Mumbai followed by Moulana Malak (Abdul Hussein Jivaji) saheb who appointed Moulana Abdul Qadir Ebrahimji saheb as his Mansoos (successor) or Vakil (the one who advocates his succession or roots / acts for his principal) that identifies his followers as Atba-e-Malak Vakil.

Their current spiritual lord / Imam is Moulana Tayyeb saheb bin Moulana Razzak saheb. Qur'an and Nasihat (Scriptures written by Syedi Sadiqali during the period of 42nd Da'i al-Mutlaq Syedna Yusuf Najmuddin saheb and 44th Da'i al-Mutlaq Syedna Mohammed Ezzuddin saheb) are main religious scriptures of Atba-e-Malak Vakil sect.  They follow all the 7 pillars of Islam - Taharat, Namaz, Zakat, Roza, Hajj, Jihad (Spiritual struggle) and Walayah (Arabic: وِلاية) in the same order as per Shia Ismaili Tayyebi beliefs in its batini (in essence) meaning.

Based on their fundamental beliefs, Saheb-e-Amar (spiritual successor) reinforces and connects with his ruhani hasab-nasab (spiritual lineage) as it happened in the past with every Nabi, Imam or Da'i al-Mutlaq.  This is not to be confused with family lineage to drive material objectives for power, strength or money as it happens in most kingdoms, business empires or political outfits on contrary Saheb-e-Amar spends most of their life and efforts for the single most important responsibility of preaching, practicing, guarding, upholding and spreading humanitarian values and causes which has always been full of difficulties and worldly troubles in every generation.  The transfer of "Amar" (Spiritual succession) from father to son must be followed in essence (Batini) and not in superficial or apparent (Zahiri) sense.  Like in real world too, the teacher's child may not end up as a teacher though the probability of teacher's child ending up as teacher may be high.  Saheb-e-Amar is representative of Al-mighty GOD on earth and exhibits divine qualities favoring (Ehsaan إحسان) the one and all to experience the presence of divinity on earth.  Therefore, in other words, the presence of divine qualities proves the Nass (divine appointment) on the Mansoos (spiritual successor) and that's why in all the sacred scriptures, it is mentioned that the body changes but the soul remains and to be fortunate to live with such lord is living in Jannat (Heaven / Paradise) where the river of water, milk, wine and honey flows as per holy Qur'an (47:15).  "(Here is) a Parable of the Garden which the righteous are promised: in it are rivers of water incorruptible; rivers of milk of which the taste never changes; rivers of wine, a joy to those who drink; and rivers of honey pure and clear. In it there are for them all kinds of fruits; and Grace from their Lord. (Can those in such Bliss) be compared to such as shall dwell for ever in the Fire, and be given, to drink, boiling water, so that it cuts up their bowels (to pieces)?" - YUSUF ALI

History

See also
 Alavi Bohra
 Atba-e-Malak Badar
 Dawoodi Bohra
 Progressive Dawoodi Bohra
 Hebtiahs Bohra
 Patani Bohras
 Sulaymani Bohra
 Sunni Bohra

References 

Tayyibi Isma'ili branches